Johannes Westö (born 1 April 1991) is a Finnish former footballer. During the 2010 Veikkausliiga season, Westö joined HJK's first eleven. His performances during the season were promising, and he was considered a good prospect for the future.

On 10 November 2010, Westö announced that he was going to have a year off from professional football, citing personal reasons and ongoing philosophy studies.

Westö is the son of the author Mårten Westö. His uncle, Kjell Westö, is also a well known Finnish novelist.

Honours
Veikkausliiga: 2009, 2010

References

External links
 Profile at HJK.fi
 Statistics at Veikkausliiga.com

1991 births
Living people
Finnish footballers
Association football midfielders
Helsingin Jalkapalloklubi players
Klubi 04 players
Veikkausliiga players